High Vinnalls is a hill in the English county of Herefordshire, though commonly considered a member of the Shropshire Hills. It is located in the parish of Pipe Aston, near the town of Ludlow, and is covered by Mortimer Forest.

References

Hills of Herefordshire